Unió Esportiva Sant Julià, also known as UE Sant Julià, is an Andorran football club based in the parish of Sant Julià de Lòria. The club currently plays in Primera Divisió.

History
Founded in 1982 UE Sant Julià is the main football club of the Andorran Southern parish of Sant Julià de Lòria. The team have been playing in the top flight since the foundation of the Andorran Premier League in 1995. Since then UE Sant Julià have won the Andorran championship twice (2004–05 and 2008–09) and are five time Copa Constitució winners (2008, 2010, 2011, 2014 and 2015).

UE Sant Julià in Europe

The club has also appeared in European competitions several times. In the 2000–01 season they were eliminated in the first round of Intertoto Cup by the Swiss team, Lausanne-Sport (aggregate 1–9). They also participated in the Intertoto Cup in 2002–03 and drew 2–2 at home against Coleraine from Northern Ireland, but away from home lost 5–0 to be eliminated from the competition. They suffered an 8–0 defeat at home in the 2004–05 season of the Intertoto Cup against the Serbian team, FK Smederevo and also fell 3–0 in Serbia. In the first qualifying round for the UEFA Cup 2005–06 they lost to Romanian team, Rapid București (aggregate 0–10).

In the first round of the 2006–07 Intertoto Cup they lost to Maribor from Slovenia (aggregate 0–8). In the first round of the 2007–08 Intertoto Cup they lost to the Bosnian squad Slavija Sarajevo 3–2 in Andorra and 3–2 again in Bosnia-Herzegovina (aggregate 4–6). Sant Julià faced Cherno More of Bulgaria in the first qualifying round of the 2008–09 UEFA Cup. They lost 0–9 on aggregate.

For the 2009–10 season, Sant Julia once again drew a Bulgarian opponent, this time for UEFA Champions League qualification in the second round – Levski Sofia. Before meeting the champions of Bulgaria, Sant Julia eliminated Tre Fiori of San Marino after two 1–1 results, and a penalty shootout. This was the first elimination in
European tournaments in the history of Andorran football.

Their dreams came to an end after a 4–0 defeat away at Sofia. The team still played well and managed to keep their goal clean for 49 minutes against the Bulgarian champion. Only 9 players from Aixovall exited the pitch after two Sant Julia players received red cards. They lost 0–5 in the return leg at home.

UE Sant Julià participated in the 2010–11 UEFA Europa League second qualifying round against MYPA and in 2011–12 against Bnei Yehuda, losing on aggregate 0–8 against the Finnish squad and 0–4 against the Israeli squad.

For the 2014–15 season UE Sant Julià returned to the European competitions playing the first round of the 2014–15 UEFA Europa League against the Serbian Čukarički team losing on aggregate 0–4. UE Sant Julià qualified for the 2015–16 European competitions the following season playing the first round of the 2015–16 UEFA Europa League against the Danish Randers FC team losing on aggregate 0–4.

UE Sant Julià qualified for European competitions in the 2017–18 and 2018–19 season, playing the first round of UEFA Europa League against KF Skënderbeu Korçë from Albania losing on aggregate 0–6, and the following season against Gżira United from Malta losing on aggregate 1–4.

Colours and badge
Traditionally orange have been the home colours of UE Sant Julià and the main colour of the team, always referred to as l'equip taronja (the orange team) or el club taronja (the orange club), and supporters. Although some seasons the club have worn black and red/orange or all green kits in home matches.

The club crest is a variation of the coat of arms of Sant Julià de Lòria.

* Since the Andorra Football Federation affiliation.

Club rivalries

El Clàssic
The main rival of UE Sant Julià in Primera Divisió has been always FC Santa Coloma playing in a derby called El Clàssic. Both teams are strong in the Andorran Premier League and since the creation of the championship the clubs have been competing for being the champion of the top flight.

Honours
Primera Divisió
Winners (2): 2004–05, 2008–09
Runners-up (7): 2000–01, 2001–02, 2003–04, 2005–06, 2007–08, 2010–11, 2016–17, 2018–19

Copa Constitució
Winners (6): 2008, 2010, 2011, 2014, 2015, 2021
Runners-up (8): 1997, 2001, 2003, 2004, 2005, 2007, 2013, 2018

Supercopa Andorrana
Winners (6): 2004, 2009, 2010, 2011, 2014, 2018
Runners-up (4): 2003, 2005, 2008, 2015

League history

Current squad

European results
As of match played 15 July 2021.

Notes
 PR: Preliminary round
 1R: First round
 1Q: First qualifying round
 2Q: Second qualifying round

References

External links
Official website (Momentarily dead link)
Sant Julià at UEFA.COM
Sant Julià at Weltfussball.de
Sant Julià at Football-Lineups.com

 
Sant Julia, UE
1982 establishments in Andorra
Association football clubs established in 1982